Alessandria Cathedral is a Roman Catholic cathedral in Alessandria, Piedmont, Italy, dedicated to Saints Peter and Mark. It is the seat of the Bishop of Alessandria.

History
 
A diocese centred on Alessandria was created in 1175 by Pope Alexander III, and a cathedral dedicated to Saint Peter was built as the bishop's seat at that time. It was too small however, so was demolished and rebuilt between 1288 and 1297. This cathedral was demolished for military tactical reasons on the order of Napoleon Bonaparte in 1803.

The dispossessed bishop and chapter received the permission of the French general of the occupying troops to elevate the church of St Mark to the status of cathedral. This church had been built in the 13th century for the use of the Dominicans. The French troops had commandeered it in 1797 for quarters. The church had however to be rebuilt: this took place from 1807 to 1810, and the new Neo-classical cathedral, named after both Saint Peter and Saint Mark, opened in December 1810.

A major restoration was carried out from 1875 to 1879, and the cathedral was actually consecrated only in 1879, at the end of these further works. The interior was badly damaged by fire in 1925, and was extensively refurbished between 1925 and 1929.

References

External links
 Diocese of Alessandria: cathedral description 
 Municipal webpage of the commune of Alessandria 
 Description of the cathedral organ 

Roman Catholic cathedrals in Italy
Cathedrals in Piedmont
Churches in the province of Alessandria
Roman Catholic churches completed in 1810
19th-century Roman Catholic church buildings in Italy
Buildings and structures in Alessandria